Students of Azerbaijan Democratic Republic abroad or Republic students, were students sent by the government of Azerbaijan Democratic Republic (ADR) at the beginning of 1920 to study in higher educational institutions of Western Europe, Russia and Turkey. In total, about 100 students from various strata of society were sent, for which 7 million rubles were allocated to the Ministry of Public Education.

After the fall of the Azerbaijan Democratic Republic and the Sovietization of the country as a result of the Red Army invasion of Azerbaijan, students continued their education. After completing their studies, many of them returned to Azerbaijan where they achieved considerable success. Some of them received government awards including the Order of Lenin. Among them were Ahmed Rajabli, Aslan Vezirzade, Ashraf Aliyev, Samandar Akhundov, Teymur Aslanov and others.

However, many of them were repressed by the NKVD in the 1930s on charges of spying for Germany and supporting the restoration of Azerbaijan's independence.

Decision to send students abroad 
By the end of 1919, the government of the Azerbaijan Democratic Republic had implemented a number of educational reforms: textbooks for primary and secondary schools were published, seminaries were opened in various regions of country, Baku State University was founded, and a law was passed on the creation of an agricultural university. Not limited to opening a university, the government was looking for ways to train the necessary specialists, in particular, sending Azerbaijani youth abroad for higher education. Despite the difficult military-political situation, it was decided to send Azerbaijanis abroad to study at European universities. Mammad Emin Rasulzade, listing the achievements of Azerbaijan, noted:

Parliament Decree 
In the summer of 1919, the Ministry of Education introduced a bill on the allocation of 4 million rubles in the 1919–20 academic year to send 100 students abroad at the rate of 36.5 thousand rubles for each of them. After completing their education, they had to work in the civil service in Azerbaijan for at least two years. Students on a government scholarship were required to work for four years on government assignment after graduation.

On 1 September 1919, the parliament decided:
 to transfer 7 million rubles from state treasury funds to the disposal of the Minister of Public Education to send one hundred applicants to foreign higher educational institutions in 1919–20 academic year.
 state scholarship students are required to serve four years after graduation where government requires.
In this regard, the parliament pointed out: "To ensure the life and existence of students, supervision must be established over them."

Organizational matters 
When discussing this bill back in the summer of 1919, there were controversies in parliamentary factions over sending students from wealthy families abroad. According to many MPs, the number of students should have included mainly representatives of the poor, and the sons of wealthy families should have had to study at their own expense. The selection was made among various segments of the population, its main criterion was only the giftedness of the citizens of the young republic. One of the selected students, repressed by the NKVD after returning Azerbaijan.

As a result, "people of both wealthy and poor" were sent to study.

On 15 September 1919, a meeting of parliament was held on the issue of state scholarships for students traveling abroad. The meeting was attended by Mammad Amin Rasulzade, Mehdi bey Hajinski, Ahmad bey Pepinov, Gara bey Garabeyov, Abdulla bey Efendiyev, Aynul Usubbekova, Behbud Khan Javanshir, Neymatulla bey Shakhtakhtinsky, Samandar Akhundov and representative of the Baku committee of Muslim students, Mammadgulu Hajinsky.

A commission was also created to organize the sending and distribution of students. Even before the parliament passed a resolution on sending students, in the summer of 1919, the "Ittihad" and "Ahrar" factions proposed that half of the people go to the faculties of history, philology, natural sciences, physics and mathematics in order to return home as teachers of secondary educational institutions. But according to their specialties, students were distributed as follows: natural science – 8, medicine – 8, mining – 7, mechanics – 11, chemistry – 3, electrical engineering – 8, construction – 4, aviation – 2, agronomy – 3, economics – 5, history and philology – 5, philosophy – 7, legal sciences – 6, political science – 3. By that time, the commission received 280 applications. The advantage in selection was enjoyed by those who knew the Azerbaijani language ("Turkic" in the terminology of that time) and the language of the country where the student was sent, who had certificates with a high score, and also poor.

Departure of students

Final preparations 

Those sent abroad have chosen a bureau consisting of 5 people to assist the commission in organizing the dispatch. Teymur Aslanov was elected chairman of the commission, who, together with Shakhtakhtinsky, went to Tiflis and Batumi to obtain the necessary passes. In order to provide for the students, the bureau petitioned the Ministry of Trade and Industry to provide each student with 40 arşın of linen, two pairs of sheets, two pairs of towels and half a dozen scarves in the amount of 2,000 rubles, as well as tea and sugar. Ministry granted this request.

Thus, on 12 December 1919, the commission decided to enroll 100 people on the list of state scholarship holders. Due to inflation, instead of 400 francs, it was decided to issue 500 francs, as well as 200 francs for the purchase of uniforms. The Ministry of Finance issued 2600 francs to each student.

Departure 
The first group of students left by fast train on 14 January 1920. Members of parliament arrived to see off the students: Mammad Amin Rasulzade, Ibrahim Abilov, Samad aga Agamalioglu, Aslan bey Safikurdski, Abbasqulu Kazimzade, Ahmed bey Pepinov. Rasulzadeh made a farewell speech from the Musavat party, Abilov from the Social Democratic Party, and Safikurdski from the Khalgchi social revolutionaries. Also performed were Samad aga Agamalioglu, Piri Mursalzade, Abbasqulu Kazimzade and others. The speakers wished the students to successfully complete their education and, after arriving home, apply the acquired knowledge for the prosperity of their native state, which then needed intelligent specialists. Minister of Agriculture Ahmed bey Pepinov, speaking on behalf of the government, assured the students that the government will not stop at any expenses required to study abroad.

Then the students settled in a carriage prepared for them, the doors of which were decorated with the flags of Azerbaijan. The sounds of tar and the singing of "Segah" were heard from the carriage, the friendly exclamations of "Long live Azerbaijan!".

At stops along the way – in Kurdamir, Hajiqabul, Yevlakh, Ganja and other settlements, people welcomed the envoys and wished them success. In Tiflis, students were provided with a special carriage for departure to Batumi. Then they arrived in Istanbul, where a reception took place at the Azerbaijani embassy. From Istanbul, the delegates went to Rome, where the young men were met by employees of the Georgian Embassy. Finally, on 11 February 1920, 78 students arrived in Paris, at the Gare de Lyon. The rest were sent to study in Russia and Turkey

Years of study

First month 
The path of specialists passed along the route Baku – Batumi – Istanbul – Trento – Rome – Paris – Basel – Berlin. However, in the archive materials, the list of countries where the applicants were planned to travel is contradictory. So, according to sources in 1919 (before leaving), the parliament adopted a law on sending 100 applicants abroad to study. Among the countries are called England – 10 student, Italy – 23, France – 45, Turkey – 9 and Russia – 13. However, the interrogation records of former German university graduates arrested in the 1930s show that Russia and England were not among the countries where students studied. Many of them were asked the question: "In which countries and how many students sent by the Musavat government were studied." Absolutely everyone named the countries listed above, except for Russia and Great Britain. From the interrogation protocols it followed that the number of people by state was as follows: 10 people in Turkey, 20 in Italy, 20 in France and 50 in Germany.

Alimardan bey Topchubashov, who received students in France, organized the execution of the relevant documents. After that, some of the students were distributed to higher educational institutions in France, while the rest went to Germany. Thus, more than half of those who were sent by the government of the ADR to study abroad arrived in Berlin. So, during interrogation in the NKVD, one of the envoys of the ADR, Ashraf Aliyev, said:

On 29 February 1920, the Ministry of National Education was additionally sent 25,200 francs to the diplomatic representative of the Azerbaijan in Istanbul, as well as 172,732 francs to the chairman of the Azerbaijani delegation at the People's Conference in Paris, Alimardan bey Topchubashov to meet the needs of commoded students until 1 September 1920. Soon, Topchubashov's radio-telegram was received in Baku on arrival in Paris of Azerbaijani students.

In Germany, in the first months of study, the students created their public organization, "Union of Azerbaijani Students in Germany" with the center in Berlin and departments in educational institutions of Darmstadt, Freiburg, Leipzig etc.

After the fall of ADR 

A few months after the start of their studies, news came from Azerbaijan: "ADR is occupied by Russian Bolsheviks". In addition to moral upheavals and a change in political power, this led to the suspension of scholarships from a special fund created by the ADR parliament. In this regard, the Committee of Azerbaijani Students in Germany in May 1921 sent to Baku one of its activists, student of the Mining Institute in Freiburg Ashraf Aliyev, in order to negotiate with the Soviet government of Azerbaijan on support of students studying in Western Europe.

Talks in Baku have led to an agreement to resume the granting of scholarships. At the same time, the Soviet authorities set some conditions, among which was the acceptance of Soviet citizenship by students. However, the amount of the scholarship that the Soviet embassy in Berlin began to issue from the budget of the Azerbaijan SSR was approximately $30. At first, money was received irregularly, and with the relocation of the chairman of the Council of People's Commissars of Azerbaijan SSR, Nariman Narimanov, to work in Moscow, the situation worsened. The leaders who came to power began to divide students into "reliable" and "unreliable". All this forced the students to work in their free time. In his autobiography, Ashraf Aliyev wrote about this period of his life:

Ajdar bey Akhundov, who studied in Paris, wrote to the Azerbaijani publicist Jeyhun Hajibeyli, who lived in exile in France, who was a member of the Azerbaijani delegation in Paris:

Two of the students, Shikhzamanov and Ismail Aliyev, went to jail for non-payment of debts. Shipbuilding student Abdul-Huseyn Dadashev wrote to Jeyhun Hajibeyli from Germany that the government removed him from the list along with several students. Dadashev called the reason for this "local comrades, whose opinions did not agree with his views."

Appointed back in 1919 to be responsible for young people studying abroad, Dr. Bahram Akhundov, being in Istanbul, wrote to Jeyhun Hajibeyli in Paris on 21 July 1922 about the situation of students, that while working in Baku for more than 2 months for students, he prepared with his own hands in the commission about 200 diamonds and sent via Moscow with two students. Not knowing how they implemented them, Akhundov noted that Narimanov wrote a letter about this to the Berlin office. Akhundov also wrote that due to the absence of Narimanov, the situation of students has completely changed. Akhundov said: "I do not forget them and I will not forget. Upon arrival in Baku I will work for them, we need them, so long as they study".

After graduation

Ones who chose to not return 

Some students after graduation did not want to return to Soviet Azerbaijan, deciding to stay behind the border and live in exile. Among them is Hilal Munshi, who was sent by the ADR government to study in Germany. Since 1928, he conducted organizational work on the decision of the governing bodies of the Azerbaijani emigration. From 1930 he worked as a technical editor, first at the newspaper "Istiklal" (Independence), and then "Kurtulush" (Salvation). In 1930, Munshi published a brochure about Azerbaijan in German. Also established contacts with public groups and the press.

The son of Alimardan bey Topchubashov, Rashid bey Topchubashov, sent to study at the University of Paris, refused the scholarship offered by the Soviet leadership of the country. Topchubashov was the personal secretary of the chairman (Alimardan bey Topchubashov, his father) of the delegation. He died in Paris in 1926.

Abbas Atamalibeyov studied shipbuilding at the Paris University. He was the secretary of the Azerbaijani delegation at the Paris Peace Conference. After completing his studies, he continued his political activities in Paris, graduated from the School of Political Sciences in Paris. After the death of Alimardan bey Topchubashov, he became leaders of Azerbaijani emigrants in France. After the occupation of France by Germany, he lived in Berlin, where he worked in the Committee of the Red Cross and played an important role in rescuing captured Azerbaijani soldiers during the World War II. He was in a group together with Abdurrahman Fatalibeyli and F. Amirjanli), associated with the activities of the Azerbaijani Legion. After World War II he lived in Chile, and in 1967 he moved to the United States, where he died in 1971.

Adil Muganli, who studied at the Faculty of Medicine of Leipzig University, did not return to Azerbaijan. He went to Paris from Berlin in 1923.

Ones who chose to return 
Many immigrants from Azerbaijan, after completing their studies, decided to return and start working for their country.

According to researcher Mammad Jafarov's notes, these people, who left independent Azerbaijan and lived in Europe for 5–10 years, began to compare capitalist ways of managing with Soviet ones and came to the idea of the need for a passive or active struggle against the existing system.

Achievements 
The graduates of European universities who have returned to their homeland have achieved great success with their work and knowledge. Some of them became directors of factories, heads of oil fields, and executives. Some of them received government awards, including the Order of Lenin.

For example, a graduate of the Dresden Polytechnic Institute, Yusuf Agasibeyli, from 1931 worked in Ganja as the chief mechanic at an oil refinery. Graduate of the Mining Institute of Freiburg, Ashraf Aliyev, became the director of the drilling office of the Kaganovichneft, and in 1932 he was awarded the Order of Lenin. Graduate of Prussian Higher Textile Institute (Cottbus), Teymur Aslanov was the director of the textile mill in Ganja. Samandar Akhundov, who also graduated from the Mining Institute of Freiburg, worked as a responsible executive in the heavy industry section of the State Planning Committee of the Azerbaijan SSR. Another graduate, Dinara Kazimova, after returning to Azerbaijan, worked in the country's industry section.

Aslan Vezirzade, a graduate of the Paris Mining Institute, who returned to Baku in 1925, taught at the Azerbaijan Polytechnic Institute, where he was the head of the department of crystallography, mineralogy and petrography, and later was awarded the title of Honored Scientist of the Azerbaijan SSR.

A graduate of the Technical Institute of Darmstadt, Bahram Huseynzade, worked in Ganja as the head of the Electrical Equipment of a textile mill, and later in Baku headed the "Azselelectro" sector at the NKZ of the Azerbaijan SSR. Asildar Muganli, who studied law at the Leipzig University in 1925, returned to Azerbaijan in 1927, worked as a consultant from 1930 to 1933, and later as head of the cash planning group at the Azerbaijan State Bank. Mahish Safarov, a graduate of the Technical Institute of Darmstadt, returned to Azerbaijan in 1926 and worked as a German teacher at the Pedagogical College of the People's Commissariat for Education. Iskenderbek Sultanov, who graduated from the Charlottenburg Polytechnic Institute in 1929, returned to the USSR in 1933 and got a job at the "Electrorazvedka" trust of Azneft.

Some, after returning to Azerbaijan, tried to emigrate back in different ways. Among those who succeeded are the graduates of the Technical Institute of Darmstadt Huseyn Shikhiev and Mamed Efendiyev, who, having arrived in Baku in 1927, left the USSR in 1930. Mirismail Seyidzade, who, after returning from Germany, worked as the chief engineer of Baktramvay, emigrated to Germany with his wife in 1934.

A graduate of the Higher Royal Experimental Agrarian Institute Perugia, Ahmed Rajabli, after returning to Azerbaijan, worked as the director of an agricultural technical school in Zagatala, organized an experimental agricultural station, having achieved the interconnection of these two structures. From 1931 to 1934, Rajabli was the head of the department of southern technical crops of the Azerbaijan Agricultural Institute and, at the same time, a consultant to the People's Commissariat of Agriculture. In 1935, the Higher Attestation Commission in Moscow awarded Rajabli the academic title of professor, he was elected a member of the subtropical crops section of the VASKhNIL, and later became an academician, a member of the Presidium of the Azerbaijan Agricultural Academy.

The father of Togrul and Vidadi Narimanbekov, Farman Narimanbekov, after graduating from the energy faculty of Toulouse University in 1929, returned to Baku and stood at the origins of the construction of the Mingechevir hydroelectric power station.

Repression and rehabilitation 

Many of the graduates of Western universities who returned to Azerbaijan were arrested in the 1930s by the NKVD as German "spies" and supporters of the restoration of Azerbaijan's independence. Judging by the analysis of archival materials about the repressed, in the 1930s, citizens of the republic were suspected of dissent and espionage to one degree or another connected with Germany or who knew at least one person of German nationality in Azerbaijan. In all investigative cases, the direction to study in Germany during the ADR years in the records of the NKVD sounded like a crime: "Was sent by the Musavat government to study in Germany"

In 1937, Yusuf Agasibeyli was arrested as a member of the Anti-Soviet Insurrectionary Movement. Ashraf Aliyev, arrested in 1936 by the NKVD, was accused of espionage for Germany and anti-Soviet statements. In 1937, he was involved in the second case as an active member of the rebel organization, whose goal was to overthrow Soviet power in Azerbaijan and separate it from the USSR. On 18 October 1937, Teymur Aslanov was arrested, accused of participation in a nationalist rebel organization and espionage activities in favor of German intelligence and sent to a camp in Siberia. Samandar Akhundov was arrested by the GPU in 1933. Bahram Huseynzade, whose wife was a German citizen and was forced to return to her homeland in 1938, was sentenced by the Supreme Court of the USSR to 15 years in prison in 1941 as a member of a nationalist rebel organization and a spy for German intelligence. In 1956, the sentence was overturned for lack of corpus delicti.

Asildar Muganli was arrested because of singing German songs in his house. During interrogation to the statement of the NKVD investigator that the authorities knew that songs were sung in German at Muganly's apartment, Makhish Safarov replied: "Yes, sometimes we sang German songs, but they were not of political content." Muganly was arrested for the first time in 1933, since 1934 he was a teacher of German at universities in Baku, and the second time he was arrested by the NKVD in 1935 and exiled to the Karaganda region. Makhish Safarov was arrested by the NKVD in 1936, and only in 1957, after appealing to the Supreme Court of the USSR with a request to reconsider the case, he was rehabilitated. In 1935, Iskenderbek Sultanov was arrested by the NKVD.

The Bolsheviks repressed not only those whom the ADR government sent to study in Germany, but also citizens sent on a mission in the first years of Sovietization. Among them was Ali Rza Atayev, who graduated from the University of Leipzig, and after returning home in 1925, he went from assistant professor of the Department of Obstetrics and Gynecology of the Azerbaijan Medical Institute to professor and head of the obstetric and gynecological clinic of the Azerbaijan Institute for Advanced Medical Studies, and in 1929 he received Doctor of Medicine degree.

Farman Narimanbekov was also repressed. He was taken away at night directly from the construction site of the Mingechevir hydroelectric power station, where he was then working. After the amnesty, he returned to Mingachevir and was a professional power engineer. On 22 August 1937, breeder Ahmed Rajabli was arrested. He was exiled to one of the numerous camps of the GULAG, Magadan Correctional Labor Camp, and there, in the harsh conditions of Magadan, he created a subsidiary farm, where he bred frost-resistant varieties of vegetable crops. In 1946, he was released and returned home where he continued his research.

Notes

References

Sources

External links 

Education section in Azerbaijan Democratic Republic encyclopedia

Education in Azerbaijan
Azerbaijan Democratic Republic